Albert von Levetzow (born September 12, 1827, in Königsberg in der Neumark; died August 12, 1903, in Königsberg in der Neumark) was a German politician for the Conservative Party of Prussia.

Career 
Levetzow went to school at Marienstiftsgymnasium in Stettin. He studied German law at Humboldt University of Berlin in Berlin, at Heidelberg University in Heidelberg and at Martin Luther University of Halle-Wittenberg in Halle.

From 1876 to 1896, he was director of Provinzialverband Brandenburg.

Levetzow was a member of the North German Reichstag from 1867 to 1871. From 1877 to 1884 and from 1887 to 1903, he was a member of German Reichstag. From 1881 to 1884 and from 1888 to 1895, Levetzow was president of the German Reichstag. From 1890 to 1903, Levetzow was a member of the Prussian House of Lords.

Personal life 
In 1864 he married Charlotte von Oertzen-Sophienhof and they had two sons.

References

General references 
 Kristina Hübener: Levetzkow, Albert Frhr. v. in: Friedrich Beck, Eckart Henning (ed.): Brandenburgisches Biographisches Lexikon (=Einzelveröffentlichung der Brandenburgischen Historischen Kommission e.V., Band 5). Verlag für Berlin-Brandenburg, Potsdam 2002, ISBN 3-935035-39-X, S. 255–256 (with portrait).
 Rainer Paetau: Die Protokolle des Preußischen Staatsministeriums 1817–1934/38. Band 5. in: Berlin-Brandenburgische Akademie der Wissenschaften (ed.): Acta Borussica. Neue Folge. Olms-Weidmann, Hildesheim 2004, ISBN 3-487-11002-4, S. 370,  (pdf-file)

External links 

 
 
 illustration Dr. Albert von Levetzow. Königl. Preuss. Wirkl. Geheimer Rat.

Prussian politicians
German Conservative Party politicians
Members of the Prussian House of Lords
Members of the 1st Reichstag of the German Empire
Members of the 3rd Reichstag of the German Empire
Members of the 4th Reichstag of the German Empire
Members of the 5th Reichstag of the German Empire
Members of the 6th Reichstag of the German Empire
Members of the 8th Reichstag of the German Empire
Members of the 9th Reichstag of the German Empire
1827 births
1903 deaths